The Chief Commissioner of the Victoria Police is the head of Victoria's police force. The Chief Commissioner and his staff act as the first point of contact between Victoria Police, government departments and relevant government ministers.

The current Chief Commissioner is Shane Patton. He assumed the office in 2020.

Roles and powers 
The Chief Commissioner is the chief constable and the chief executive officer of Victoria Police, and reports to the Minister for Police.

Under the Victoria Police Act 2013, it is the responsibility of the Chief Commissioner to implement relevant policy and law of the Government within the police force, advising and informing the Police Minister on the operations of the police force, and is responsible for general conduct, performance and operations of Victoria Police.

Term of the chief commissioner 
It is the duty of the Governor of Victoria to appoint the chief commissioner. The candidate for the role is typically chosen on the advice of the sitting Premier of Victoria.

The chief commissioner can be appointed for a maximum term of five years, however, they may, albeit rare, be reappointed after their five year term.

List of chief commissioners

Reference list 

Chief Commissioners of Victoria Police
Victoria (Australia)-related lists